Jean-François Richet (born 2 July 1966) is a French screenwriter, film director, and film producer. He grew up in Meaux, a suburb east of Paris.

Select filmography
 Inner City (1995) – nominated at the 21st César Awards in the Best First Feature Film (Meilleure Première Œuvre) category.
 Ma 6-T va crack-er (1997) – a film which caricatures gang warfare.
 Assault on Precinct 13 (2005), a loose remake of John Carpenter's 1976 film of the same name
 Mesrine (2008)
 One Wild Moment (2015)
 Blood Father (2016)
 The Emperor of Paris (2018)
 Plane (2023)

References

External links
 

Living people
Writers from Paris
French film directors
French film producers
French male screenwriters
French screenwriters
Best Director César Award winners
1966 births